Lisbon is a village in and the county seat of Columbiana County, Ohio, United States, along the Little Beaver Creek. The population was 2,597 at the 2020 census.

History
Lisbon was platted on February 16, 1803, by Baptist minister Lewis Kinney, originally named New Lisbon after Lisbon, Portugal. The village was incorporated under a special act of legislature on February 7, 1825. Initially known for its iron and whiskey production, New Lisbon became an economic hub of many sorts into the first industrial revolution, and one of the largest towns on the Sandy and Beaver Canal. During this time, the village claimed the county's first bank, the Columbiana Bank of New Lisbon; its first insurance company, and the first Ohio newspaper, The Ohio Patriot, founded by an Alsatian immigrant, William D. Lepper. 

Lisbon has the distinction of being the northernmost western town involved in military actions during the American Civil War. Confederate Army general John Hunt Morgan surrendered to New Lisbon militia forces in nearby West Point at the end of Morgan's Raid into Ohio. After the failure of the canal, the town had to wait until the late 1860s to receive railroad access once the Niles and New Lisbon Railroad opened. It and the later Pittsburgh, Marion & Chicago Railway helped bring industry to the area, including the porcelain manufacturing R. Thomas and Sons Company. The village was renamed to Lisbon in 1895. In 1900, the modern drinking straw was invented and patented in Lisbon. 

In 1899, Jacob L. Beilhart founded the Spirit Fruit Society, an intentional community to practice his newly developed beliefs, in Lisbon. Its goal was to "teach mankind how to apply the truths taught by Jesus Christ," which included a rejection of jealousy and materialism. The commune only attracted about a dozen residents, mostly from outside the area. However, views against marriage and promoting free love were not accepted well in Lisbon, and the group left for Chicago in late 1904.

Lisbon became a qualified Tree City USA as recognized by the National Arbor Day Foundation in 1981.

Geography
Lisbon is located at  (40.773874, -80.767553).

The following highways pass through Lisbon: 
  U.S. Route 30
  State Route 45
  State Route 154
  State Route 164
  State Route 517

Demographics

2010 census
As of the census of 2010, there were 2,821 people, 1,138 households, and 693 families residing in the village. The racial makeup of the village was 97.4% White, 1.1% African American, 0.2% Native American, 0.2% Asian, 0.2% from other races, and 0.9% from two or more races. Hispanic or Latino of any race were 1.2% of the population.

There were 1,138 households, of which 30.1% had children under the age of 18 living with them, 42.4% were married couples living together, 13.0% had a female householder with no husband present, 5.5% had a male householder with no wife present, and 39.1% were non-families. 34.2% of all households were made up of individuals, and 13.4% had someone living alone who was 65 years of age or older. The average household size was 2.35 and the average family size was 3.00.

The median age in the village was 39.6 years. 23.1% of residents were under the age of 18; 9% were between the ages of 18 and 24; 24.3% were from 25 to 44; 28.1% were from 45 to 64; and 15.5% were 65 years of age or older. The gender makeup of the village was 47.3% male and 52.7% female.

2000 census
As of the census of 2000, there were 2,788 people, 1,133 households, and 696 families residing in the village. The population density was 2,521.1 people per square mile (969.8/km). There were 1,253 housing units at an average density of 1,133.0 per square mile (435.8/km). The racial makeup of the village was 97.74% White, 0.90% African American, 0.22% Native American, 0.22% Asian, 0.04% Pacific Islander, 0.29% from other races, and 0.61% from two or more races. Hispanic or Latino of any race were 0.61% of the population.

There were 1,133 households, out of which 30.1% had children under the age of 18 living with them, 46.5% were married couples living together, 11.9% had a female householder with no husband present, and 38.5% were non-families. 34.3% of all households were made up of individuals, and 16.8% had someone living alone who was 65 years of age or older. The average household size was 2.37 and the average family size was 3.07.

In the village, the population was spread out, with 24.9% under the age of 18, 8.8% from 18 to 24, 27.8% from 25 to 44, 22.6% from 45 to 64, and 15.9% who were 65 years of age or older. The median age was 38 years. For every 100 females, there were 89.7 males. For every 100 females age 18 and over, there were 87.0 males.

The median income for a household in the village was $27,841, and the median income for a family was $36,707. Males had a median income of $29,271 versus $19,826 for females. The per capita income for the village was $14,097. About 10.1% of families and 14.1% of the population were below the poverty line, including 13.4% of those under the age of 18 and 5.2% of those 65 years or over.

Arts and culture
Lisbon is host to the annual Columbiana County Fair in the summer and the Lisbon Johnny Appleseed Festival in the fall; the real Appleseed had planted an apple tree nursery in the area in the 1800s. The Dulci-More Festival, a music festival dedicated to the Appalachian dulcimer and other traditional musical instruments, formerly took place over Memorial Day weekend at Camp McKinley, a Boy Scout camp near Lisbon from 1995 to 2019.

Folk band Bon Iver paid tribute to the village in the instrumental song "Lisbon, OH", from their 2011 Grammy Award-winning album Bon Iver, Bon Iver.

The village is home to the public Lepper Library, founded in 1897. The building site on Lincoln Way and a $10,000 grant were donated by Virginia Lepper in memory of her late husband.

In 2020, Lisbon became an official North Country National Scenic Trail Town

Government
Lisbon operates under a mayor–council government, where there are six council members elected as a legislature in addition to an independently elected mayor who serves as an executive. The current mayor is Peter Wilson (I). Additionally, Lisbon has a Board of Trustees of Public Affairs, a three-member board elected separately from the village council.

Education

Children in Lisbon are served by the Lisbon Exempted Village School District. The current schools in the district are:
 McKinley Elementary School – 441 E Chestnut Street, grades K-5
 David Anderson Junior/Senior High School – 260 W Pine Street, grades 6-12
The school's athletic teams are known as the Blue Devils. The most heavily followed athletic programs at Lisbon's high school are football and basketball. Most notable is Lisbon's 1995 Division V State Championship in football, the only such championship in that sport ever to be held by a Columbiana County school.  Other sports include track, swimming, golf, cross country, baseball, softball, volleyball, and cheerleading.

The Columbiana County Career and Technical Center is immediately south of city limits.

Media
Lisbon is home to the Morning Journal, a local newspaper serving Columbiana County. The result of multiple mergers, it began printing in 1909.

Notable residents

William W. Armstrong, journalist, 15th Ohio Secretary of State
George M. Ashford, surveyor, pioneer of Arctic Alaska 
Reasin Beall, U.S. Representative from Ohio's 6th district
Jacob L. Beilhart, communitarian leader, founder of Spirit Fruit Society
Lucretia Longshore Blankenburg, suffragist and writer
William T. H. Brooks, U.S. Army Major General during the American Civil War
John C. Chaney, U.S. Representative from Indiana's 2nd district
John Hessin Clarke, Associate Justice of the United States Supreme Court
Charles D. Coffin, U.S. Representative from Ohio's 17th district
Katy Easterday, football and basketball player with the Pittsburgh Panthers and later collegiate football and basketball coach
George A. Garretson, U.S. Army Brigadier General
John M. Gilman, politician who served in the Ohio and Minnesota House of Representatives
Howard Melville Hanna, businessman
Mark Hanna, U.S. Senator from Ohio and chairman of the Republican National Committee
Andrew W. Loomis, U.S. Representative from Ohio's 17th district
Fighting McCooks, famed officers in the Union Army during the American Civil War
Daniel McCook, attorney and Union Army major
George Wythe McCook, 4th Ohio Attorney General, Union Army colonel
Henry Christopher McCook, clergyman and author, Union Army chaplain
John James McCook, lawyer and professor, Union Army chaplain
Robert Latimer McCook, Union Army brigadier general
Roderick S. McCook, U.S. Navy officer
Betty McKenna, All-American Girls Professional Baseball League third basewoman
William McKinley Sr., pioneer of the iron industry in eastern Ohio, father of President William McKinley
Thayer Melvin, 4th West Virginia Attorney General
James D. Moffat, 3rd President of Washington & Jefferson College
William Duane Morgan, newspaper editor and politician
Stephen Paxson, missionary who started over 1,300 Sunday schools in the American frontier
Robert Walker Tayler, U.S. Representative from Ohio's 18th district
John Thomson, U.S. Representative from Ohio's 6th, 12th, and 17th districts
Clement Vallandigham, copperhead leader and U.S. Representative from Ohio's 3rd district

References

External links
 Village of Lisbon
 Lisbon Area Chamber of Commerce

County seats in Ohio
Villages in Columbiana County, Ohio
Villages in Ohio
Populated places established in 1803
1803 establishments in Ohio